Modiolus albicostus is a species of "horse mussel", a marine bivalve mollusc in the family Mytilidae, the mussels.

Description

Distribution
This species is widespread from Indochina to Southwestern Australia.

References
Biolib
Discover Life
Encyclopaedia of Life
WoRMS
Worldwide Mollusc Species Data Base

albicostus
Bivalves described in 1819
Taxa named by Jean-Baptiste Lamarck